Julian King is a Grammy Award-winning recording engineer, mix engineer, record producer and musician based in Nashville, Tennessee. In one capacity or another, he has been involved with records that have sold more than 100 million units (see listing below). King has worked with some of the most notable artists in country music, such as George Jones, George Strait, Waylon Jennings, Willie Nelson, Kenny Rogers and Merle Haggard. Other artists he has worked with include Tim McGraw, Vince Gill, Charlie Daniels, Hank Williams, Jr., Clint Black, Martina McBride, Randy Travis, Brooks & Dunn, Toby Keith, Alabama and The Judds. His credits also extend to some of the hottest young acts in country music today, such as Sugarland, Chris Young, Kellie Pickler, Lauren Alaina and Casey James.

King earned a Grammy as the recording engineer of Faith Hill's multi-million-selling, pop-crossover album Breathe.

History

Raised by school principal parents in Charlottesville, Virginia, King attended nearby James Madison University as a music major, with a plan to become a session trumpet player, but his true calling was tied to using technology to reproduce music.  In 1987, during his junior year at college, he landed an internship working as "an assistant to the assistant" engineer at recording sessions for producer Jimmy Bowen. King learned quickly and was told a job would be there for him when he graduated the following year. Working under producer Bowen, King was instantly in sessions with such country superstars as George Strait. While working on an album with Charlie Daniels, King was teased by the star for being a trumpeter. Eventually, Daniels not only asked King to play trumpet on the record, he paid for King to join the American Federation of Musicians union.
 
In time, King became a favorite of top producers James Stroud and Byron Gallimore. Some of the earliest Number One hits King engineered were the career-launching singles by Tracy Lawrence and Clay Walker. One of his favorite projects from those early years is the 1992 John Anderson CD Seminole Wind. In 1993, he was tapped to engineer the disc debut of the then-unknown Tim McGraw. King has engineered every Tim McGraw album since that time. He also helped create the sound that kick-started Toby Keith's career.

King was behind the board for Common Thread: The Songs of the Eagles, an album that won the CMA Award as Album of the Year for 1994.  Stroud brought him on board as a co-producer in 1998, and King delivered "I'm Yours" as a hit for Grammy-winning singer Linda Davis. In the following year came Faith Hill's Breathe, which earned King his own Grammy Award.  Noting his increasing prominence, Mix magazine profiled Julian King in 2001.

Since then, King has produced "I Should Be Sleeping" and "Only God (Could Stop Me Loving You)" as 2001–2002 hits for Emerson Drive. In 2007, King reunited with Tracy Lawrence and co-produced the star's CMA Award-winning hit "Find Out Who Your Friends Are". He has also continued to work constantly as an engineer, notably on Lee Ann Womack's 2005 CMA Album of the Year There's More Where That Came From and on the multi-million selling discs of two-time CMA Group of the Year, Sugarland. King engineered the two most recent albums by Chris Young which produced a string of five consecutive #1 hits, as well as albums by Kix Brooks (formerly of Brooks & Dunn) and American Idol finalists Kellie Pickler, Lauren Alaina and Casey James.

Most recently, King has been involved in producing Tyler Farr's debut album for Sony/BNA.

Awards
1999 – Grammy Award – Best Country Album for Faith Hill's Breathe
2007 – CMA Award – Musical Event of the Year for Tracy Lawrence's Find Out Who Your Friends Are, with Tim McGraw and Kenny Chesney

Credits

Production

Engineering/Mixing

References

External links
 Discography at AllMusic.com
 Discography at AlbumCredits.com
 Julian King Feature in Mix Magazine, 2001
 Grammy Awards winners at Grammy.com (searchable database)

Year of birth missing (living people)
Living people
James Madison University alumni
American audio engineers
American country record producers
Businesspeople from Charlottesville, Virginia
Engineers from Virginia